Route 188 is a state highway in west-central Connecticut, running in an "L" pattern from Seymour to Middlebury.

Route description

Route 188 begins at an intersection with Route 34 in Seymour on the east shore of the Housatonic River and heads northeast before crossing into Oxford.  In Oxford, it heads northwest from its junction with the western end of Route 334 across the town before entering Southbury.
In Southbury, it heads north along the Eight Mile River, briefly overlapping with Route 67.  It then continues northeast past Waterbury-Oxford Airport to intersect I-84 at Exit 16.  It then enters Middlebury, where it turns east at the center of town, briefly overlapping with Route 64 before turning southeast once again.  After passing under I-84 without an interchange, Route 188 ends at an intersection with Route 63.

History

Route 188 was commissioned in 1935 from former unsigned state roads, running from the current southern terminus in Seymour to Old Waterbury Road (former Route 135) in Middlebury.  In approximately 1943, it was extended to its current northern terminus at Route 63 along the eastern half of former Route 135.

Junction list

References

External links

188
Transportation in New Haven County, Connecticut